The eastern angelshark (Squatina albipunctata) is an angelshark of the family Squatinidae.

Measurements
Born: 30 cm TL; Mature: ~ 91 cm (M), 107 cm (F) TL; Max: 110 cm (M), 130 cm (F) TL.

Identification
Colour: Are a yellow-brown to a chocolate-brown, obtains dense patterns of small white dark edged symmetrical spots, also with many large brownish blotches. Has white nuchal spot (no ocelli). Also has light unspotted unpaired fins. Body: Has a very short snout. Has concave interorbital space and heavy orbital thorns which can be distinguished from Squatina australis. The nasal barbels have extended tips and lobate fringes. Has low lateral head folds. The spiracles are close to the eyes, and are wider than eye-length. Obtains strong orbital thorns, and no medial row of predorsal thorns are shown.

Distribution and range
Pacific: eastern Australia. Found between Cairns, Queensland and Lakes Entrance, Victoria. 17°S - 38°S.

Climate and habitat
Tropical; Outer continental shelf and upper slope, benthopelagic, marine. Usually found in sand, 37-4 15 m down, but occasionally up to 60 m.

Behaviour
Unknown.

Biology
Diet: Probably feeds on bony fishes, crustaceans, and cephalopods. Reproduction: Up to 20 pups per litter.

Status
IUCN Red List: Vulnerable.

Threat to humans 
Harmless.

Resilience and vulnerability
Medium, minimum population doubling time 1.4 - 4.4 years; moderate to high vulnerability.

References
 Compagno, Dando, & Fowler, Sharks of the World, Princeton University Press, New Jersey 2005 
 Pogonoski, J. & Pollard, D. 2003.  Squatina sp. nov. A.   2006 IUCN Red List of Threatened Species.   Downloaded on 3 August 2007.

eastern angelshark
Marine fish of Eastern Australia
eastern angelshark
eastern angelshark